Frumentius (died c. 383) was a Phoenician Christian missionary and the first bishop of Axum who brought Christianity to the Kingdom of Aksum. He is sometimes known by other names, such as Abuna ("Our Father") and Aba Salama ("Father of Peace").

He was ethnically a Phoenician, according to Rufinus, born in Tyre, modern day Lebanon. As a boy, he was captured with his brother, and they became slaves to the King of Axum. He freed them shortly before his death, and they were invited to educate his young heir. They also began to teach Christianity in the region. Later, Frumentius traveled to Alexandria, Egypt, where he appealed to have a bishop appointed and missionary priests sent south to Axum. Thereafter, he was appointed bishop and established the Church in Ethiopia, converting many local people, as well as the king. His appointment began a tradition that the Patriarch of Alexandria appoint the bishops of Ethiopia.

Biography
According to the fourth-century historian Tyrannius Rufinus (x.9), who cites Frumentius' brother Edesius as his authority, as children (ca. 316) Frumentius and Edesius accompanied their uncle Meropius from their birthplace of Tyre (now in Lebanon) on a voyage to Ethiopia. When their ship stopped at one of the harbors of the Red Sea, local people massacred the whole crew, sparing the two boys, who were taken as slaves to the King of Axum. The two boys soon gained the favor of the king, who raised them to positions of trust. Shortly before his death, the king freed them. The widowed queen, however, prevailed upon them to remain at the court and assist her in the education of the young heir, Ezana, and in the administration of the kingdom during the prince's minority. They remained and (especially Frumentius) used their influence to spread Christianity. First they encouraged the Christian merchants present in the country to practice their faith openly, and they helped them find places "where they could come together for prayer according to the Roman Rite"; later they converted some of the natives.

When the prince came of age, Edesius returned to Tyre, where he stayed and was ordained a priest. Frumentius, eager for the conversion of Ethiopia, accompanied his brother as far as Alexandria, where he requested Athanasius, Patriarch of Alexandria, to send a bishop and some priests as missionaries to Ethiopia. By Athanasius' own account, he believed Frumentius to be the most suitable person for the job and consecrated him as bishop, traditionally in the year 328, or according to others, between 340 and 346.

Frumentius returned to Ethiopia, where he erected his episcopal see at Axum, then converted and baptized King Ezana, who built many churches and spread Christianity throughout Ethiopia. Frumentius established the first monastery of Ethiopia, called Dabba Selama in Dogu'a Tembien. The people called Frumentius Kesate Birhan (Revealer of Light) and Abba Salama (Father of Peace). He became the first Abune, a title given to the head of the Ethiopian Church.

In about 356, the Emperor Constantius II wrote to King Ezana and his brother Saizana, requesting them to replace Frumentius as bishop with Theophilos the Indian, who supported the Arian position, as did the emperor. Frumentius had been appointed by Athanasius, a leading opponent of Arianism. The king refused the request.

Ethiopian traditions credit him with the first Ge'ez translation of the New Testament, and being involved in the development of Ge'ez script from an abjad (consonantal-only) into an abugida (syllabic).

Feast date
The Ethiopian Orthodox Tewahedo Church and Eritrean Orthodox Tewahedo Church celebrate the feast of Abba Salama's consecration  on Taḫśaś (the 4th month of Ethiopian or Coptic calendar) 18 and departure Hamle (the 11th month of Ethiopian or Coptic calendar) 26.

The Coptic Orthodox Church of Alexandria celebrates the feast of Frumentius on 18 December, the Eastern Orthodox Church on 30 November and the Catholic Church on 20 July.

Patronage
Frumentius is regarded as the patron saint of the former Kingdom of Aksum, and its contemporary territories.

He is the patron saint of St Frumentius Theological College, the Anglican seminary in Ethiopia.

See also
 4th century in Lebanon
 Saint Frumentius, patron saint archive

References

Martyrologium Romanum, Editio Altera, (Citta del Vaticano: Libreria Editrice Vaticana, 2004), p. 401

External links
"San Frumenzio", Santi e Beati 
Catholic News Agency: Frumentius of Ethiopia 
Saints.SQPN: Frumentius
Catholic Online: Frumentius

380s deaths
People from the Aksumite Empire
History of Ethiopia
Lebanese saints
Bishops of Axum
Syrian Christian saints
Ethiopian saints
4th-century bishops
4th-century Christian saints
Creators of writing systems
People from Tyre, Lebanon
Year of birth unknown
4th-century births
Christian missionaries in Ethiopia
Missionary linguists
4th-century Phoenician people